William Nelson (June 29, 1784 – October 3, 1869) was an American lawyer and judge from Westchester County, New York. He represented New York in the U.S. Congress from 1847 to 1851.

Biography
Born in Hyde Park, Dutchess County, New York, on June 29, 1784, Nelson attended the common schools and was graduated from Poughkeepsie Academy. He studied law and was admitted to the bar in 1807, and commenced practice in Peekskill, Westchester County, New York. He married  Cornelia Mandeville Hardman, and they had 12 children, Richard, Joseph, Cornelia, Dorinda, George, Thomas, Sarah, William, Elizabeth, Edward, Laura, and Robert.

Career
Nelson was a member of New York state assembly from Westchester County from 1819 to 1821. He was a member of the New York state senate, 2nd District, from 1824 to 1827. He was a state court judge for the correction of errors in New York from 1824 to 1827. For thirty years he served as district attorney for Putnam, Rockland, and Westchester Counties.

Elected as a Whig to the Thirtieth and Thirty-first Congresses as U.S. Representative from New York for the 7th District, Nelson served from March 4, 1847 – March 3, 1851. He resumed the practice of his profession.

Death
Nelson died in Peekskill, Westchester County, New York, on October 3, 1869 (age 85 years, 96 days). He is interred at Hillside Cemetery, Cortlandt town, Westchester County, New York.

References

External links

1784 births
1869 deaths
New York (state) state court judges
People from Peekskill, New York
People from Hyde Park, New York
Whig Party members of the United States House of Representatives from New York (state)
19th-century American politicians
19th-century American judges